The Canton of Perpignan-1 is a French canton of Pyrénées-Orientales department, in Occitanie. It covers the northern part of the commune of Perpignan. At the French canton reorganisation which came into effect in March 2015, the canton was enlarged.

Composition
Before 2015, the Perpignan 1st Canton included the following neighbourhoods of Perpignan:
 Polygone-Nord
 Haut-Vernet
 Moyen-Vernet
 Hospital

References 

Perpignan 1